Amanda Elizabeth Toll is an American politician serving as a member of the New Hampshire House of Representatives from the Cheshire 16 district. She assumed office on December 2, 2020.

Early life and education 
Toll was born and raised in New Hampshire. She earned a Bachelor of Arts degree in political science, women's studies, and modern American history from Hampshire College and a Master of Education from the University of Massachusetts Amherst.

Career 
Outside of politics, Toll has worked as a social studies teacher and small business-owner. She was elected to the New Hampshire House of Representatives in 2020 and is a member of the House State-Federal Relations and Veterans Affairs Committee.

In January 2022, Toll co-sponsored a bill that would require consent education to be a part of the curriculum in New Hampshire public schools.

References 

Living people
Democratic Party members of the New Hampshire House of Representatives
Women state legislators in New Hampshire
Hampshire College alumni
University of Massachusetts Amherst alumni
Year of birth missing (living people)